

The List of South African television series lists TV series that were created and/or shown in South Africa since 1975. It includes both South African originals and foreign imports that were dubbed into local languages.

0-9

A

B

C

D

E

F

G

H

I

J

K

L

M

N

O

P

Q

R

S

T

U

V

W

X

Y

Z

See also
Television in South Africa
SABC
Multichoice
eTV

References

External links

 
South Africa
South African television-related lists